Louis Jean Mathieu "Jean-Maurice" Goossens (16 January 1892 - 6 July 1965) was a Belgian ice hockey player. He won the 1913 European title and finished fifth at the 1920 Summer Olympics.

References

External links
 

1892 births
1965 deaths
Ice hockey players at the 1920 Summer Olympics
Olympic ice hockey players of Belgium
People from Seraing
Sportspeople from Liège Province
Belgian ice hockey left wingers